Lake Velence, an endorheic basin, is the third largest natural lake in Hungary. It is a popular holiday destination among Hungarians.

The lake has an area of 26 km2, one third of which is covered by the common reed. Because of the sunny climate of the area and the shallowness of the lake, it is one of the warmest lakes in Europe: its temperature in the summer may reach 26 to 28 °C.

Location
Lake Velence is located in Fejér county, close to the M7 motorway between Budapest and Székesfehérvár,  at the foot of the Velence Mountains.

Settlements along the shore

Gárdony
Agárd
Dinnyés
Kápolnásnyék
Nadap
Pákozd
Pázmánd
Sukoró
Velence
Velence-újtelep
Velencefürdő
Vereb
Zichyújfalu

Wildlife 
A part of the lake is a bird reserve with a lot of species.

Events
The lake was the venue for the World Rowing Masters Regatta in September 2019.

Gallery

References

External links
 Google Maps of Lake Velence
 Aerial photographs
 Lake Velence at funiq.hu 

Velence
Geography of Fejér County
Tourist attractions in Fejér County
Endorheic lakes of Europe